= Scottsdale Blues =

- Full name: Scottsdale Blues Rugby Club
- Union: USA Rugby
- Nickname: Blues
- Founded: 1984; 42 years ago
- Location: Scottsdale, Arizona
- Ground: McDowell Mountain Ranch Park
- CEO: Harmen Tjaarda
- Director of Rugby: Ted Brandt
- Coach: Gary Lane
Team kit

Official website
- www.scottsdaleazrugby.com

Scottsdale Blues Rugby Club is an American rugby team based in Scottsdale, Arizona. The team plays in USA Rugby Division III.

== History ==
The club was founded in 1984.

== Honours ==
- USA Rugby Division III Southwest
  - 2024
